A list of films produced in Brazil in 1933:

See also
 1933 in Brazil

External links
Brazilian films of 1933 at the Internet Movie Database

Brazil
1933
Films